USS O-11 (SS-72) was one of 16 O-class submarines built for the United States Navy during World War I.

Description
The later O-boats (O-11 through O-16) were designed by Lake Torpedo Boat Company to different specifications from the earlier ones designed by Electric Boat. They did not perform as well, and are sometimes considered a separate class. They displaced  on the surface and  submerged. The O-class submarines had a crew of 29 officers and enlisted men.

For surface running, the boats were powered by two  diesel engines, each driving one propeller shaft. When submerged each propeller was driven by a  electric motor. They could reach  on the surface and  underwater.

The boats were armed with four 18-inch (450 mm)  torpedo tubes in the bow. They carried four reloads, for a total of eight torpedoes. The O-class submarines were also armed with a single 3"/50 caliber deck gun.

Construction and career
O-11 was laid down on 6 March 1916 by Lake Torpedo Boat in Bridgeport, Connecticut. The boat was launched on 29 October 1917 sponsored by Mrs. Bernard M. Baruch, and commissioned at New York City on 19 October 1918. Commissioned too late for World War I combat service, O-11 joined other boats of her class at Cape May, New Jersey, in 1919.  On 20 September 1919, she was placed in commission, in reserve, at Cape May and steamed to Philadelphia, Pennsylvania, in October; workmen at Philadelphia spent months working on the boat before she departed for Coco Solo.

The arrival of a submarine squadron at Coco Solo in 1913 had demonstrated the usefulness of the boats, the base continued as a distant submarine overhaul and testing area into the 1920s. O-11 reported there in 1922; after deck crews had brought her up to prime efficiency, she took several test dives off Panama in spring 1923. In October, she sailed to Philadelphia.

O-11 decommissioned at Philadelphia 21 June 1924 after just five and a half years of service, and was turned over to the Commandant, Navy Yard, Philadelphia.  Struck from the Naval Vessel Register on 9 May 1930, the boat was sold in July 1930.

Notes

References

External links
 
"Through The Looking Glass : A Photo Essay of Submarines 1900-1940" - The O-boats

United States O-class submarines
World War I submarines of the United States
Ships built in Groton, Connecticut
1917 ships